Swayamvaram is a 1999 Indian Telugu-language romantic comedy drama film directed by K. Vijaya Bhaskar and produced by  Venkata Shyam Prasad under SP Entertainments. The film stars debutants Venu Thottempudi and Laya in lead roles. Swayamvaram also marks the screenwriting debut of Trivikram Srinivas who would later go on to become a noted filmmaker in Telugu cinema. 

Swayamvaram won four Nandi Awards. The film was remade in Tamil as Love Marriage (2001) and in Hindi as Kyaa Dil Ne Kahaa (2002).

Plot

Cast 
 Venu Thottempudi as Venu
 Laya as Anu
 Giribabu
 Brahmaji
 Ali
 Kota Srinivasa Rao
 Kavitha
 Sudha
 M. S. Narayana
 Ironleg Sastri
 Sunil
 Raghunatha Reddy
 Rajitha

Music 
The music  of the film was composed by  Vandemataram Srinivas and lyrics for the songs were penned by Bhuvanachandra.

Awards

References

External links 
 

1990s Telugu-language films
Films directed by K. Vijaya Bhaskar
Indian romantic comedy-drama films
Telugu films remade in other languages